The blacktail pike-conger (Hoplunnis diomediana) is an eel in the family Nettastomatidae (duckbill/witch eels). It was described by George Brown Goode and Tarleton Hoffman Bean in 1896. It is a subtropical, marine eel which is known from the western Atlantic Ocean. It is known to dwell at a maximum depth of 203 meters. Males can reach a maximum total length of 36.6 centimeters.

References

Nettastomatidae
Fish described in 1896